Buffy the Vampire Slayer: Autumnal is a trade paperback collecting comic stories based on the Buffy the Vampire Slayer television series.

Story description

General synopsis
Buffy is being hunted by a monster which wants to kill her and initiate the end of the world. This is nothing new to Buffy yet it seems like the only person who can save her is a previous Slayer who has been in the ground a long time. Buffy also faces a backpack of maggots, a rat-infested cafeteria.

Buffy the vampire Slayer #26
Comic title: The Heart of a Slayer, part 1 

Buffy is being hunted by a monster which wants to kill her and initiate the end of the world. This is nothing new to Buffy yet it seems like the only person who can save her is a previous Slayer who has been in the ground a long time ago. Buffy and her friends try to overcome confusion.

Buffy the vampire Slayer #27
Comic title: The Heart of a Slayer, part 2 

Buffy finds out why she is being hunted by the nightmare monster from fourteenth-century France and also why the slayer from that era is determined to halt it. However stopping the creature may mean an ultimate sacrifice for one of the slayers.

Buffy the vampire Slayer #28
Comic title: Cemetery of Lost Love 

Buffy's familiar with Sunnydale weirdness but now she puzzlingly has a backpack full of maggots, and comes across a cafeteria overrun by a herd of rats. Buffy suspects foul play, and must get to the bottom of who is trying to gross her out.

Continuity
Supposed to be set in the autumn of Buffy the Vampire Slayer's fourth season.

Canonical issues

Buffy comics are not usually considered by fans as canonical. However, unlike fan fiction, overviews summarizing their story, written early in the writing process, were approved by both Fox and Joss Whedon (or his office), and the books were therefore later published as officially Buffy merchandise.

Comics based on Buffy the Vampire Slayer